At 22:43 on May 24, 2001, a large portion of the third floor of the Versailles Wedding Hall collapsed in Talpiot, Jerusalem, Israel. Twenty-three people fell to their deaths through two stories, while another 380 were injured to varying degrees.

The disaster is among the deadliest civil disasters in Israeli history, with only the 2010 Mount Carmel forest fire and the 2021 Meron crowd crush having a higher number of deaths.

In the aftermath of the disaster, the Israeli parliament passed the "Versailles Law" establishing a special committee responsible for treating the people injured in the disaster and an investigative committee was established by the then-Prime Minister Ariel Sharon under the leadership of the former judge Vardimos Zeiler, which probed both the Versailles disaster and the Maccabiah bridge collapse which had occurred several years earlier.

Eli Ron, who invented the  construction method, and three engineers involved in the construction of the hall were found guilty along with the three owners of the hall of causing death by negligence and sabotage by negligence.

Background 
The Versailles Wedding Hall was built in 1986 in Talpiot in southeastern Jerusalem by engineer Eli Ron, who invented the  method. The floors were built with metal plates and thin layers of cement. The floor had started to visibly sag and as a result, the owners installed partitions on the floors below to stabilize and correct the sagging floors. Shortly thereafter, the owners, thinking that the issue was cosmetic, decided to remove these partitions.

Several years before in 1997, during the Maccabiah Games, a bridge collapsed killing 4 Australians participating in the games. Investigations found that poor construction methods were at fault for the collapse and the engineers responsible for the construction of the bridge were found guilty of death by negligence.

Collapse 
On May 24, 2001, the third floor of the wedding hall was being used to host the wedding of Keren and Asaf Dror. Shortly before the collapse, hundreds of wedding guests were on the dance floor (with a cover by Sarit Hadad of the song “Lev Zahav” playing) when wedding guests noticed the floor sagging several inches seconds before the fall. The third floor then gave way sending hundreds of guests plummeting two stories below.

Casualties 
23 people fell to their deaths and 380 people were injured to varying degrees including bride Keren Dror, who suffered serious pelvic injuries which required multiple surgeries. Asaf Dror, the groom, escaped serious injury.

Rescue efforts 
Rescue efforts were carried out by the Home Front Command's Search & Rescue Unit and the Yachtza reserve unit. Rescue efforts commenced immediately after the collapse and continued until 4pm on Saturday May 26, 2001. Three people were pulled from the rubble alive, and 23 bodies were removed.

Documentation 
The disaster was captured by cameraman David Amromin who was recording the wedding of Asaf and Keron Dror via camcorder. The footage which captured the collapse and subsequent mayhem was broadcast around the world on TV networks.

Investigation 

An investigation of the event concluded that it was not caused by a terrorist attack (the disaster occurred during the Second Intifada). This was based on the testimony provided by many of the wedding guests present in the building during the disaster. Witnesses reported seeing a dangerous sag in the floor moments before the collapse. An initial inquiry blamed the collapse on the Pal-Kal method of constructing light-weight coffered concrete floor systems which was banned shortly after the completion of the wedding hall since it was known and proven to be unsafe. Further review pointed to a combination of two alternative causes.

Initially, the side of the building that failed was designed to be a two-story structure, while the other side was designed to be three stories. Late in the construction process, it was decided that both sides of the building should be equal heights, and a third story was added to the shorter side. However, the live load due to occupancy is typically much greater than the design load for a roof. As a result, the structure supporting the new third story was subjected to much greater loading than was originally anticipated. The effect of this error was somewhat mitigated by the construction of partitions on the floor below, which helped redistribute the excess load such that no damage was incurred.

A few weeks before the collapse, the wedding hall owners decided to remove the partitions. With the load path eliminated, the floor above began to sag several centimetres. The owners viewed the sagging floor primarily as a cosmetic problem, and attempted to level it with additional grout and fill. However, their approach not only failed to provide additional structural capacity, it also inadvertently introduced a new and significant dead load at the weakened area.

During the wedding event in 2001, this significantly overstressed floor section failed, resulting in the catastrophe. The engineer Eli Ron, inventor of the Pal-Kal method of construction, was arrested and subsequently indicted in August 2002 on the charge of manslaughter.

Aftermath
Following the disaster, the "Versailles Law" was passed by the Parliament of Israel. This law established a special committee responsible for treating the people injured in the disaster. Moreover, an official investigation committee was established by the then Prime Minister Ariel Sharon under the leadership of the former judge Vardimos Zeiler(he), who was in charge of the security of public places and buildings. The Zeiler Committee on Building Safety investigated both the Versailles wedding hall collapse as well as the Maccabiah bridge collapse which occurred four years earlier in 1997, and released its final report in December 2003.

In October 2004, the three owners of Versailles wedding hall — Avraham Adi, Uri Nisim, and Efraim Adiv – were convicted of causing death by negligence and causing damage by negligence. Adi and Adiv were sentenced to 30 months' imprisonment while Nisim was sentenced to four months of community service.

The wedding hall was subsequently demolished, and as of 2017 the site remained unoccupied and sealed. Across the street from the site is a memorial garden with names of victims inscribed on a wall.

In May 2007, Eli Ron and three engineers involved in the building's construction were sentenced to prison by the Jerusalem District Court. Eli Ron received a four-year sentence, Shimon Kaufman and Dan Sheffer 22 months, and Uri Pessah six months. In December 2006, the court convicted all three men of causing death by negligence and sabotage by negligence.

In popular culture 
The Pal-Kal issue was mentioned in the episode "Point of Origin", season 1, episode 5, of the show 9-1-1, where an Indian Wedding goes awry when dancing guests collapse the third floor, killing dozens. Captain Robert Nash describes the building having used the prohibited "Kal-Pal" technique and angrily attacks the owner for causing death by negligience.

Memorial 
A memorial garden to the victims was built near the disaster site.

See also 
 Structural failure
 List of structural failures and collapses
 Hyatt Regency walkway collapse, a similar incident that occurred 20 years prior that was due to insufficient load capacity as a result of negligent design flaws.

Notes

 Levinson, Jay. "Review of Press Coverage: The Versailles Hall Disaster," Disaster Prevention & Management, Volume 10:4 (2001), pp. 289–290.

External links 

 BBC report of the accident
 CNN report
 YouTube video

Building collapses in 2001
2001 disasters in Asia
May 2001 events in Asia
Building collapses in Asia
2001 in Jerusalem